Chilia Veche (Romanian pronunciation: /kiˈlija ˈveˈke/; meaning Old Chilia) is a commune in Tulcea County, Northern Dobruja, Romania, in the Danube Delta. It gave its name to the Chilia branch of the Danube, which separates it from Ukraine. It is composed of four villages: Câșlița, Chilia Veche, Ostrovu Tătaru and Tatanir.

Founded by the Greek Byzantines, it was given its name after the word for "granaries" - , kellia, recorded earliest in 1241 in the works of Persian chronicler Rashid al-Din. Some scholars consider the mediaeval Genoese trade centre known as Lycostomo was also located here. A town on the other side of the Danube, now in Ukraine, known as Novo Kilia or "New Chilia", was built by Stephen the Great of Moldavia in order to counteract the Ottoman Empire (that had taken control of the former town in the 15th century).

Ostrovu Tătaru village, which has no permanent population, is located on Tătaru Mare Island.

References

 for the commune
 for the town

Communes in Tulcea County
Localities in Northern Dobruja
Romania–Ukraine border crossings
Byzantine sites in Romania
Territories of the Republic of Genoa
Place names of Greek origin in Romania